Neslihan Yeldan (born 25 February 1969) is a Turkish actress.

She started her career in 1987 by joining Ortaoyuncular, a community of actors. In 1995, Yeldan graduated from Istanbul University State Conservatory with a degree in theatre studies. She then worked for theatre communities such as Kent Oyuncuları, Istanbul Folk Theatre, Dormen Theatre and Duru Theatre before joining Beşiktaş Culture Center. She eventually started her television career in 1993 with a role in the TV series Yaz Evi. Besides appearing in numerous TV and cinematic productions, she has also worked as a voice actress. Her breakthrough came with her role in Bir Demet Tiyatro as Füreya.

Filmography

Theatre

References

External links 
 
 

1969 births
Turkish film actresses
Turkish stage actresses
Turkish television actresses
Turkish voice actresses
Living people